Reginaldus de Combe (fl. 1300/1301) was an English Member of Parliament.

He was a Member (MP) of the Parliament of England for Lewes in 1300/1301.

References

13th-century births
14th-century deaths
People from Lewes
English MPs 1301